New York's 114th State Assembly district is one of the 150 districts in the New York State Assembly. It has been represented by Matt Simpson since 2021.

Geography

2020s
District 114 contains portions of Saratoga, Essex and Washington counties, and all of Warren County.

2010s
District 114 contained portions of Saratoga and Washington counties, and all of Essex and Warren counties.

Recent election results

2022

2020

2018

2016

2014

2012

References

114